Rodrigo Marta is a Portuguese rugby union player who plays for US Dax in France. He is Portugal's record try scorer with 25 tries in 29 caps.

Career 

In 2021 he was named part of the Lusitanos XV squad for the inaugural Rugby Europe Super Cup. The Lusitanos came in 2nd place falling short against the Black Lion in the final.

He joined French Nationale 1 side US Dax in 2022 where he is currently leading the Nationale 1 try scoring table with 10 tries in 13 games.

He signed a 3-year contract with ProD2 side US Colomiers from 2023 to 2026, joining fellow Portuguese teammate Jose Lima.

International career 
Marta made his international debut coming off the bench in the 40th minute in the 2017–18 Rugby Europe International Championships promotion match against Romania.

In 2023 after scoring 4 tries in a match against Poland in the Rugby Europe Championship, Marta became his nations top try scorer.

Honours 
2018–19 Rugby Europe Trophy (Portugal)

2021–22 CN Honra (Belenenses)

RWC 2023 Final Qualification Tournament (Portugal)

References 

Living people
1999 births
Portuguese rugby union players
Portuguese rugby sevens players
Rugby union centres
US Colomiers players
US Dax players